Ian MacCormick (known by the pseudonym Ian MacDonald; 3 October 1948 – 20 August 2003) was a British music critic and author, best known for both Revolution in the Head, his critical history of the Beatles which borrowed techniques from art historians, and The New Shostakovich, a study of Russian composer Dmitri Shostakovich.

Biography
MacDonald briefly attended King's College, Cambridge, at first to study English, then archaeology and anthropology. He dropped out after a year. While at Cambridge, he was distantly acquainted with the singer/songwriter Nick Drake. From 1972 to 1975 he served as assistant editor at the NME. MacDonald began a songwriting collaboration as lyricist with Quiet Sun, which included his brother Bill MacCormick and future Roxy Music guitarist Phil Manzanera. The collaboration resumed in the late 1970s, with MacDonald providing lyrics for the album Listen Now. Later, Brian Eno assisted MacDonald in producing Sub Rosa, an album of his songs released on Manzanera's label.

In his 1994 Revolution in the Head: The Beatles' Records and the Sixties, MacDonald carefully anatomised each recording by the Beatles, examining the broad themes and sources of inspiration. The book contains detailed song-by-song analysis, but is often subjective and critical. Paul McCartney has stated his dissatisfaction with its accuracy. Access to the original Beatles master tapes was allowed during research.

The book also includes his essay "Fabled Foursome, Disappearing Decade", an analysis of the social and cultural changes of the 1960s and their after-effects. The entries about the Beatles' singles that topped the singles chart were released in a separate book in 2002. The edit featured a new, shorter introduction and featured only the essays on the songs on the Beatles' chart-topping album, 1.

His The New Shostakovich attempted to put the works of the Russian composer in their political and social context. MacDonald's insistence on creating a cinematic scenario for every major piece polarised opinion sharply. He was a regular reviewer for the UK magazine Classic CD.

The success of Revolution in the Head motivated him to resume popular music writing, and he began contributing to Mojo and Uncut music magazines. The People's Music, an anthology of these writings, was published in July 2003 just weeks before his death. He had been working on a book entitled Birds, Beasts & Fishes: A Guide to Animal Lore and Symbolism, and another about David Bowie. Neither has been published.

Death
In August 2003, MacDonald died by suicide at his Gloucestershire home following a lengthy period of clinical depression. He was 54. MacDonald's body was cremated.

The track "Wish You Well" on Phil Manzanera's 2004 album 6PM is a tribute to MacDonald.

Discography
Quiet Sun, Mainstream (1975)
Phil Manzanera, Diamond Head (1975)
Phil Manzanera/801, Listen Now (1977)

Publications
The New Shostakovich (1990).  (reprinted & updated in 2006)
Revolution in the Head: The Beatles' Records and the Sixties (1994). 
The People's Music (2003)

Notes

External links
 Guardian Obituary
 MacDonald's essay on Nick Drake
 Music under Soviet Rule : Shostakovichiana, a website he maintained with Shostakovich information and trivia

1948 births
2003 suicides
Alumni of King's College, Cambridge
British music critics
Classical music critics
Canterbury scene
NME writers
Suicides in England
2003 deaths